The Mitterrand doctrine (from French: Doctrine Mitterrand) was a policy established in 1985 by French President François Mitterrand, of the Socialist Party, concerning Italian far-left terrorists who fled to France: those convicted for violent acts in Italy, excluding "active, actual, bloody terrorism" during the "Years of Lead", would not be extradited to Italy.

The Mitterrand Doctrine was effectively repealed in 2002, under the government of Jean-Pierre Raffarin during the presidency of Jacques Chirac, when  was extradited from France.

Establishment 
Mitterrand defined his doctrine during a speech at the Palais des sports in Rennes on February 1, 1985. Mitterrand excluded active terrorists from the protection. On 21 April 1985, at the 65th Congress of the Human Rights League (LDH), he declared that Italian criminals who had broken with their violent past and had fled to France would be protected from extradition to Italy:

"Italian refugees (...) who took part in terrorist action before 1981 (...) have broken links with the infernal machine in which they participated, have begun a second phase of their lives, have integrated into French society (...) I told the Italian government that they were safe from any sanction by the means of extradition".

The policy statement was followed by French justice when it came to the extradition of far-left Italian terrorists or activists. According to a 2007 article by the Corriere della Sera, Mitterrand was convinced by Abbé Pierre to protect those persons. According to Cesare Battisti's lawyers, Mitterrand had given his word in consultation with the Italian prime minister, the fellow socialist Bettino Craxi.

In practice 
The commitment was long taken the place of general policy of extradition of activists and Italian terrorists until it has ceased to be in force since the extradition of Paolo Persichetti in 2002, a former member of the Red Brigades, which was approved by the Raffarin government. The Cesare Battisti case, in particular, has provoked debate about the interpretation of doctrine Mitterrand.

Opponents of the doctrine point out that what a president can say during his tenure is not a source of law and so the doctrine has no legal value. Proponents point out that it was nevertheless consistently applied until 2002 and consider that the former president had committed the country by his words.

Its supporters (intellectuals like Fred Vargas or Bernard-Henri Lévy, organizations such as the Greens, the Human Rights League,  etc.), along with some personalities of the Socialist Party (PS), are opposed to noncompliance by the right in power with the Mitterrand doctrine.

The doctrine has been strongly criticized by the Italian Association of Victims of Terrorism ( or AIVITER), which in 2008 expressed particular 

French President Jacques Chirac said that he would not oppose the extradition of persons wanted by the Italian courts.

End 
The  Mitterrand doctrine was based on a supposed superiority of French law and its alleged greater adherence to European standards and principles concerning the protection of human rights. That vision entered in crisis, from a legal viewpoint, when the European Court of Human Rights (EHCR) finally ruled against the French procedure in absentia, which is often used as a touchstone to consider the Italian procedure as being in fault. In its ruling, which breaks down to the root of French institutions, the ECHR decided that the so-called process of purgation in the absence, the new trial afyer the arrest of the fugitive, is only a procedural device. The new process may therefore not be comparable to a guarantee for the prisoner that is given in France under Article 630 of the Code of Criminal Procedure, the first trial in absentia is held without the presence of lawyers in explicit violation of the right to defence enshrined in Article 6, paragraph 3 letter c) of the European Convention for the Protection of Human Rights and Fundamental Freedoms (ECtHR: Krombach v. France, application no. 29731/96). Following this ruling, France partly amended its default procedure by the 9 March 2004 "Perben II" Act, untenable for European standards on human rights. The current procedure in the absence is defined as par défaut and allows for the defence by a lawyer.

In 2002, France extradited Paolo Persichetti, an ex-member of the communist terrorist group Red Brigades (BR) who was teaching sociology at the university, in breach of the Mitterrand doctrine. However, in 1998, Bordeaux's appeal court had judged that Sergio Tornaghi could not be extradited to Italy on the grounds that Italian procedure would not organise a second trial after the first trial in absentia. The extraditions in the 2000s decade involved not only members of the Red Brigades but also other leftist activists who had fled to France and were being sought by Italian justice. They included Antonio Negri, who eventually chose to return to Italy and surrender to Italian authorities.

In 2004, French judicial officials authorised the extradition of Cesare Battisti. In 2005 the Conseil d'État confirmed the extradition and marked the end of the Mitterrand doctrine. Nonetheless Battisti had already fled to Mexico and subsequently to Brazil, where he lived as fugitive for the following 14 years. In 2018, when Brazil revocated his protection, he fled again to Bolivia and unsuccessfully sought asylum. He was arrested and extradited to Italy to expiate his sentence of life imprisonment for four murders.

Commenting on the doctrine Gilles Martinet, an old socialist intellectual and former ambassador to Italy, wrote in the preface to a book that was dedicated to the Battisti case, "Not being able to make a revolution in our country, we continue to dream of it elsewhere. It continues to exist the need to prove ourselves that we are always on the left and that we have not departed from the ideal".

The list of Italians who benefited from the Mitterrand doctrine include: 
Toni Negri;
Cesare Battisti, sentenced to life imprisonment for four murders;
;
Sergio Tornaghi;
Oreste Scalzone;
Marina Petrella;
Franco Piperno;
;
Enrico Villimburgo and Roberta Cappelli, sentenced to life imprisonment for murder;
Giovanni Alimonti and Maurizio di Marzio, sentenced respectively to 22 and 15 years for a series of attacks;
Enzo Calvitti, sentenced to 21 years for attempted murder;
Vincenzo Spano, considered one of the leaders of the Organized Committees for the Liberation of the Proletariat;
Massimo Carfora, who was sentenced to life imprisonment;
Giovanni Vegliacasa, member of Prima Linea;
Walter Grecchi, sentenced to 14 years for the murder of a police officer;
, sentenced to 22 years in prison along with Sofri and Bompressi for the murder of prosecutor Calabresi;
Simonetta Giorgieri and Carla Vendetti, suspected of contacts with the new Red Brigades, may also still be in France.

Reasons
The Mitterrand doctrine was upheld until the early 2000s by French intellectuals on the alleged nonconformity of Italian legislation with European standards.

The French President opposed aspects of the anti-terrorist laws passed in Italy during the 1970s and the 1980s that created the status of collaboratore di giustizia" ("collaborators with justice" known commonly as pentito), similar to the crown witness legislation in the United Kingdom and the Witness Protection Program in the United States in which people charged with crimes may become witnesses for the state and possibly receive reduced sentences and protection.

Italian legislation also provided that if a defendant can conduct his defence via his lawyers, trials held in absentia did not need to be repeated if he was eventually apprehended. The Italian in absentia procedure was upheld by the European Court of Human Rights (ECHR).

Film 
 After the War (2017)

See also 
History of the Italian Republic
Strategy of tension

References

External links 
  La France, l’Italie face à la question des extraditions – Institut François Mitterrand
   (texts by Giorgio Agamben, Paolo Persichetti, Oreste Scalzone, news articles, etc.)
  Battisti se livre à la justice médiatique, Le Figaro
  Berlusconi, Chirac : deux hommes intègres face à Battisti, Le Grand Soir
  Cesare Battisti : l’État français aux ordres de Berlusconi, Politis, February 19, 2004
  Le fugitif raconte sa cavale dans un livre, La République des lettres

Contemporary French history
François Mitterrand
French Fifth Republic
Foreign policy doctrines
History of the Italian Republic
Years of Lead (Italy)
Extradition
France–Italy relations